Ptilomycalin A is an antifungal alkaloid isolated from a marine sponge.

Notes

Antifungals
Heterocyclic compounds with 3 rings
Spiro compounds
Oxepanes
Tetrahydropyrans
Guanidine alkaloids